"J'suis pas dupe" is the first single by French singer Pomme from her debut EP En cavale and was released on 29 June 2015 via Polydor Records. "J'suis pas dupe" was written by Pomme herself and produced by Yann Arnaud, it reached position 66 in Belgium, becoming her second-highest song in that country after "Okay".

Music video 
The music video was directed by Sébastien Brodart, who also directed the rest of En cavale music videos, and was released on 29 June 2015. The music video shows Pomme riding a bicycle along a rural road.

Personnel 
Credits adapted from En cavale and "J'suis pas dupe" liner notes.

Musicians 
 Pommelead and backing vocals, cello
 Olivier Margueritbass guitar, piano, synthesizer
 Sammy Decosterguitar, banjo
 Jean Thevenindrums, percussion
 Victor Rouxcomposer

Design 
 Frank Lorioudesign
 Lucie Sassiatphotography

Production 
 Yann Arnaudproduction, recording
 Jean-Dominique Grossardadditional recording
 Antoine Chabertmastering, engineering

Recording 
 Recorded at La Frette Studios (La Frette-sur-Seine, France), Melodium Studio (Paris, France), and Studio Polydor (London, England)
 Mixed at La Frette Studios (La Frette-sur-Seine, France) and Melodium Studio (Paris, France)
 Mastered at Translab (Paris, France)
 Produced at La Frette Studios (La Frette-sur-Seine, France) and Melodium Studio (Paris, France)

Charts

References

External links 
 Lyrics of this song at Musixmatch
 

2015 singles
Pomme songs